BeyondCorp is an implementation, by Google, of zero-trust computer security concepts creating a zero trust network. It was created in response to the 2009 Operation Aurora.
An open source implementation inspired by Google's research paper on an access proxy is known as "transcend".

Security mechanisms
Unlike traditional VPNs, BeyondCorp's access policies are based on information about a device, its state, and its associated user. BeyondCorp considers both internal networks and external networks to be completely untrusted, and gates access to applications by dynamically asserting and enforcing levels, or “tiers,” of access.

See also
 VPN
 RADIUS

References

External links
 

Computer security
Google software